Hoverberget is a mountain on a peninsula in the southern part of the Storsjön lake. The mountain, a significant landmark and a Natura 2000 designated nature reserve, lies within Berg Municipality in the southern parts of Jämtland in northern Sweden.

Hoverberget is made of porphyry, and originates from the same period as the Scandinavian Mountains. For millions of years it has been moving eastwards, and it now lies isolated and apart from other mountains. The mountain is rich in flora, with several orchid species, and many of the plants grow at their northernmost growth boundary. There are several rare species of moss and lichen. The mountain also has a rich bird life, with many birds of prey such as the common kestrel, the Eurasian sparrowhawk and the long-eared owl. Besides more common mammals, Hoverberget is also home to Eurasian lynx.

It was discovered 1897 by Jöns Väst, a Swedish-American.  of the cave is accessible to visitors. According to a folk tale, a giant called the Old Man of Hoverberg Lad (Hoverbergsgubben) resided in the cave, but he moved out when people began to tidy the cave.

At the top of Hoverberget is a small café, which is open in the summer season. Adjacent to it is an observation tower, for those who want to look for the lake monster Storsjöodjuret, a folkloric phenomenon in the lake, or to enjoy the view.

References

External links 
 Geological survey conducted on the area surrounding Hoverberget 
Hoverberget Nature reserve 
Hoverbergsgrottan 

Mountains of Sweden
Caves of Sweden
Nature reserves in Sweden
Geography of Jämtland County
Landforms of Jämtland County
Tourist attractions in Jämtland County